is a Japanese singer and model.

Biography
Miho Morikawa got her start at the age of 17 after winning a singing contest, which led to her first album, called Sentimental Times, in 1986. Soon after her debut, she started writing lyrics and eventually composing some of the songs as well. On her EP Holiday, Miho played the blues harp in some songs. Her 1992 album, Freestyle, debuted at No.10 on the Japanese Album Chart.  She has done songs for several anime series; including "Blue Water" and "Yes I Will" from Fushigi no Umi no Nadia, "Positive" from Ranma ½, and "By Yourself" from a Dirty Pair OAV and "Yahoo!" the second opening of Kenichi: The Mightiest Disciple with Akira Asakura under the group name Diva x Diva. Her most recent album was Glad (2010).

References

External links
Official blog 

Actresses from Osaka Prefecture
1968 births
Living people
Japanese women singers
Musicians from Osaka Prefecture